Aleptina is a genus of moths of the family Noctuidae. The genus was erected by Harrison Gray Dyar Jr. in 1902.

Species
 Aleptina aleptivoides (Barnes & McDunnough, 1912)
 Aleptina arenaria Metzler & Forbes, 2011
 Aleptina clinopetes (Dyar, 1920)
 Aleptina inca Dyar, 1902
 Aleptina junctimacula Todd, Blanchard & Poole, 1984
 Aleptina semiatra (Smith, 1902)

References

Acronictinae
Noctuoidea genera